Hennequin is a French surname. Notable people with the surname include:

Alfred Hennequin (1842–1887), Belgian dramatist
Benjamin Hennequin (born 1984), French weightlifter
Daniel Hennequin (born 1961), French physicist
Denis Hennequin (born 1958), French businessman
Emile Hennequin (1859-1888), a French philosopher
Philippe-Auguste Hennequin (1762–1833), French painter
Victor Hennequin, French medium

See also
Point Hennequin, headland of Antarctica

French-language surnames